Lachana ladakensis is a species of moth of the subfamily Lymantriinae. It is found in the mountains of Ladakh, in Kashmir in northwestern India.

Taxonomy
It was described by Frederic Moore in 1888 as the first species of his new monotypic genus Lachana. The holotype is the original specimen studied by Moore and it is kept at the Natural History Museum in London. It remained the only species in Lachana until 2008, when Tatyana A. Trofimova moved three species from Gynaephora to the genus and described a new species.

Description
The wingspan is about 24 mm. The head, thorax, and abdomen are densely pilose, with long silky brown and brownish-grey hairs. The forewings are triangular, brown ochreous with dark brown bands. The basal area is sepia brown, covered with dark brown scales and outlined by a dark band. The hindwings are widely triangular, dark brown with an indistinct dark marginal band and with a lighter medial area.

Distribution
Besides the holotype, least four specimens of this species are known, all from three localities in the Ladakh area; one is undated, while the other three were collected in 1980. The only two collection localities published are the high mountain passes of Zoji La (at 4,200 m elevation) and Fotu La (3,700 m).

References

Moths described in 1888
Lymantriinae